Totapolakanda (also Thotupolakanda or Thotupola Kanda), is the third highest mountain in Sri Lanka situated in Nuwara Eliya district  above mean sea level. The mountain is located within the Horton Plains National Park. A trail to the top of the mountain, about two kilometres long, starts a few metres away from the Pattipola entrance to the Horton Plains National Park. Most parts of the mountain surface is covered with shrubs adapted to the cool and windy climate of Horton Plains National Park. Strobilanthes, Osbeckia and Rhodomyrtus species grown as shrubs are common among them.

Legend 
Totapolakanda has the meaning of ‘Landing Site’ in Sinhala language which related to a legend of Rama and Ravana. According to the legend, King of India, Rama and his beautiful wife Sita lived in exile in the jungle. Once Ravana kidnapped Rama’s wife Sita and escaped to Sri Lanka. On the way to Sri Lanka plane first landed in Totapolakanda which has the meaning of landing site.

See also 
 Geography of Sri Lanka
 List of mountains in Sri Lanka

References 

Mountains of Sri Lanka
Landforms of Nuwara Eliya District